Tree moss is a common name for several organisms and may refer to:

Climacium, a genus of mosses which resemble miniature trees
Climacium dendroides, a common species of Climacium
Evernia,  a genus of lichens which grow on trees
Usnea,  a genus of lichens which grow on trees